Alexander Victor Prusin (born Lviv, Ukraine;  (1 August 1955 - 13 August 2018) was a professor of history at the New Mexico Institute of Mining and Technology from 2001 to 2018. He specialized in the history of Russia and Eastern Europe, nationalism, ethnic conflict, and genocide.

Works 

 The Lands Between: Conflict in the East European Borderlands, 1870-1992 (2010)
 Nationalizing a Borderland: War, Ethnicity, and Anti-Jewish Violence in East Galicia, 1914–1920 (2016)
 Serbia under the Swastika: A World War II Occupation (2017)
 Justice Behind the Iron Curtain: Nazis on Trial in Communist Poland (2018)

References

1955 births
2018 deaths
American people of Ukrainian descent
New Mexico Institute of Mining and Technology faculty
American historians